Qoliabad (also Romanized as Qolīābād) is a village in Qoroq Rural District, Baharan District, Gorgan County, Golestan Province, Iran. At the 2006 census, its population was 1,617, in 392 families.

References 

Populated places in Gorgan County